Ruta Gerulaitis (born November 18, 1955) is a former professional tennis player from the United States. She is the sister of Vitas Gerulaitis.

Biography

Early life
Gerulaitis, the daughter of Lithuanian immigrants, grew up in New York City. She and Vitas, an elder brother, were the only children of Vitas Gerulaitis Sr. and Aldona Gerulaitienė (née Čenkutė).

It wasn’t until the age of 15 that she began playing tennis competitively.

Tennis career
Gerulaitis and her brother teamed up at the 1975 US Open to make the quarter-finals of the mixed doubles.

At the 1978 Wimbledon Championships, Gerulaitis made it to the fourth round of the singles and en route won a match against 16th seed Marita Redondo, in which she dropped just two games.

Her best performance in a grand slam tournament came at the 1979 French Open, where she was a singles quarter-finalist. Beating Chris O'Neil in the first round, she started her second round match with a 6–0 first set against 14th seed Ilana Kloss, before her South African opponent retired hurt. In the third round she upset eighth seed Betty Stöve in straight sets, then was beaten in the quarter-finals by the only other American remaining in the draw, eventual tournament champion Chris Evert.

She competed on the WTA Tour until 1980.

Personal life
Gerulaitis married ABC Sports vice-president John Martin in 1983.

References

External links
 
 

1955 births
Living people
American female tennis players
Tennis people from New York (state)
American people of Lithuanian descent
Sportspeople from New York City
21st-century American women